The 8th Emmy Awards, later referred to as the 8th Primetime Emmy Awards, were held on March 17, 1956, to honor the best in television of the year. The ceremony was held at  the Pan Pacific Auditorium in Hollywood, California and was hosted by Art Linkletter and John Charles Daly. All nominations are listed, with winners in bold and series' networks are in parentheses.

The top shows of the night were The Phil Silvers Show, and Producers' Showcase. Each show won a record four major awards. Producers' Showcase, with its twelve major nominations, became the first show to receive over ten major nominations. (Both of these records were subsequently passed by multiple shows).

Winners and nominees
Winners are listed first, highlighted in boldface, and indicated with a double dagger (‡).

Programs

Acting

Lead performances

Supporting performances

Single performances

Directing

Producing

Writing

Best Specialty Act – Single or Group

Most major nominations
By network 
 CBS – 61
 NBC – 54
 ABC – 11

 By program
 Producers' Showcase (NBC) – 12
  The United States Steel Hour (CBS) – 7
 Ford Star Jubilee (CBS) / Make Room for Daddy (ABC) – 6
 The Bob Cummings Show (CBS) / The Phil Silvers Show (CBS) – 5
 Caesar's Hour (NBC) / Climax! (CBS) – 4
 Alcoa-Goodyear Playhouse (NBC) / Disneyland (ABC) / The George Gobel Show (NBC) / The Honeymooners (CBS) / I Love Lucy (CBS) / Kraft Television Theatre (NBC) – 3

Most major awards
By network 
 CBS – 14
 NBC – 8
 ABC – 2

 By program
 The Phil Silvers Show (CBS) / Producers' Showcase (NBC) – 4
 Ford Star Jubilee (CBS) – 3
 Disneyland (ABC) - 2

Notes

References

External links
 Emmys.com list of 1956 Nominees & Winners
 

008
Emmy Awards
Primetime Emmy Awards
Primetime Emmy Awards
Primetime Emmy Awards
Primetime Emmy Awards